Thecomas or theca cell tumors are benign ovarian neoplasms composed only of theca cells. Histogenetically they are classified as sex cord-stromal tumours. 

They are typically estrogen-producing and they occur in older women (mean age 59; 84% after menopause). (They can, however, appear before menopause.)

60% of patients present with abnormal uterine bleeding, and 20% have endometrial carcinoma.

Pathologic features

Grossly, the tumour is solid and yellow.  

Grossly and microscopically, it consists of the ovarian cortex.  

Microscopically, the tumour cells have abundant lipid-filled cytoplasm.

References

External links 

Gynaecological neoplasia